Luca Garavoglia (born 27 February 1969) is an Italian billionaire businessman, and the chairman of the Campari Group. As of September 2021, his net worth is estimated at US$5.1 billion.

Luca Garavoglia was born in Milan on 27 February 1969. He was educated at Milan's Istituto Leone XIII, and received a bachelor's degree in economics from Bocconi University, Milan in 1994.

Garavoglia has been the chairman of Campari Group since September 1994.

Following the death of his mother, Rosa Anna Magno Garavoglia on 22 November 2016, it was announced that her son Luca Garavoglia, chairman of Campari "would now assume control of Alicros, which owns 51 percent of Campari's equity, and an even greater share of voting rights".

References

1969 births
Living people
Italian billionaires
Italian businesspeople
Campari Group people